{{Speciesbox
| name = Yellow grass orchid
| image = Apostasia wallichii (2).jpg
| image_caption = Apostasia wallachii growing near Cairns
| genus = Apostasia
| species = wallichii
| authority = R.Br.
| synonyms_ref = 
| synonyms =
 Mesodactylis wallichii (R.Br.) Endl.
 Mesodactylis deflexa Wall.
 Niemeyera stylidioides F.Muell.
 Apostasia stylidioides (F.Muell.) Rchb.f.
 Neumayera stylidioides (F.Muell.) Rchb.f.
 Apostasia gracilis Rolfe
 Apostasia alba Rolfe
 Apostasia lucida Blume ex Siebe
 Apostasia papuana Schltr.
 Apostasia curvata J.J.Sm.
 Apostasia wallichii var. seraweiensis J.J.Sm.
 Apostasia nipponica Masam.
 Apostasia wallichii subsp.  nipponica (Masam.) Masam.
 Apostasia wallichii var. nipponica (Masam.) Masam.
}}Apostasia wallichii, commonly known as the yellow grass orchid, is a species of orchid that is native to India, Japan, China, Southeast Asia, New Guinea and northern Australia. It has many arching, dark green, grass-like leaves and up to forty small, star-like yellow flowers arranged on a branched flowering stem. It mainly grows in wet forest and rainforest.

DescriptionApostasia wallichii is a terrestrial, tuberous, evergreen herb, scarcely recognisable as an orchid. It has wiry, branched roots with fleshy, warty projections and an erect, fibrous stem with many grass-like leaves arranged in whorls along it. Flowering occurs between December and March in Australia and in August in China.

Taxonomy and namingApostasia wallichii was first formally described in 1830 by Robert Brown. Brown's manuscript was published in Nathaniel Wallich's book, Plantae Asiaticae Rariores. The specific epithet (wallichii'') honours Nathaniel Wallich.

Distribution and habitat
It is found in Hainan, south-west Yunnan, Bangladesh, Cambodia, India, Indonesia, southern Japan, Nepal, Malaysia, Myanmar, Sri Lanka, Thailand, Vietnam, the Philippines, New Guinea and Queensland where if occurs between Bamaga and Ingham.

References

wallichii
Plants described in 1830
Orchids of Queensland
Orchids of China
Orchids of India
Orchids of Indonesia
Orchids of Japan
Orchids of Malaysia
Orchids of New Guinea
Orchids of the Philippines
Orchids of Vietnam